Prosictodon is an extinct genus of pylaecephalid dicynodont from Middle Permian of South Africa. It was first named by Kenneth D. Angielczyk and Bruce S. Rubidge in 2010 and the type species is Prosictodon dubei.

References

Dicynodonts
Guadalupian synapsids
Fossil taxa described in 2010
Prehistoric animals of Africa
Guadalupian genus first appearances
Guadalupian genus extinctions
Anomodont genera